This is a list of settlements in Messenia, Greece.

 Achladochori
 Adriani
 Aetos
 Agaliani
 Agios Floros
 Agios Nikolaos
 Agios Nikon
 Agios Sostis
 Agrilia
 Agrilia
 Agrilos
 Agrilovouno
 Aithaia
 Akritochori
 Alagonia
 Alonia
 Altomira
 Amfeia
 Amfithea
 Ammos
 Ampeliona
 Ampelofyto
 Ampelokipoi
 Analipsi
 Andania
 Androusa
 Anemomylos
 Ano Dorio
 Ano Melpeia
 Antheia
 Anthousa
 Antikalamos
 Archaia Messini
 Arfara
 Ariochori
 Aris
 Aristodimio
 Aristomenis
 Armenioi
 Arsinoi
 Artemisia
 Artiki
 Asprochoma
 Aspropoulia
 Avia
 Avlonas
 Avramiou
 Chalazoni
 Chalkias
 Chandrinos
 Charakopio
 Charavgi
 Chatzis
 Chomatada
 Chora
 Chranoi
 Christianoupoli
 Chrysochori
 Chrysokellaria
 Daras
 Dasochori
 Desyllas
 Diavolitsi
 Diodia
 Doloi
 Dorio
 Draina
 Drosia
 Elaia
 Elaiochori
 Ellinoekklisia
 Eva
 Evangelismos
 Exochiko
 Exochori
 Falanthi
 Faraklada
 Filia
 Filiatra
 Flesias
 Floka
 Foiniki
 Foinikounta 
 Gargalianoi
 Glyfada
 Glykorrizi
 Iklaina
 Ilektra
 Kainourgio Chorio
 Kakaletri
 Kalamaras
 Kalamata
 Kalitsaina
 Kallirroi
 Kallithea
 Kalo Nero
 Kalochori
 Kalogeresi
 Kalogerorrachi
 Kalyvia
 Kamari
 Kampos
 Kaplani
 Kardamyli
 Karnasi
 Karpofora
 Karteroli
 Karveli
 Karyes
 Karyovouni
 Kastania, Messini
 Kastania, West Mani
 Kato Melpeia
 Katsaros
 Kefalinos
 Kefalovrysi
 Kefalovryso
 Kentriko
 Kentro
 Klima
 Kokkino
 Koklas
 Kompoi
 Konstantinoi
 Kopanaki
 Koromilea
 Koroni
 Koryfasi
 Koukkounara
 Kourtaki
 Koutifaris
 Kouvelas
 Kremmydia
 Kryoneri
 Kynigos
 Kyparissia
 Lachanada
 Ladas
 Lagkada
 Laiika
 Lampaina
 Lantzounato
 Lefki
 Lefkochora
 Longa
 Loutro
 Lykissa
 Lykotrafos
 Lykoudesi
 Madena
 Magoula
 Mali
 Malta
 Malthi
 Mandra
 Manesis
 Manganiako
 Maniaki
 Mantzari
 Marathopoli
 Margeli
 Mathia
 Mavrommati
 Meligalas
 Meropi
 Mesochori
 Mesopotamos
 Messini
 Metamorfosi
 Metaxada
 Methoni
 Mikri Mantineia
 Mikromani
 Mila
 Milea
 Miliotio
 Militsa
 Monastiri
 Mouriatada
 Mouzaki
 Myro
 Myrsinochorio
 Nea Koroni
 Neda
 Nedousa
 Neochori Aristomenous
 Neochori Ithomis
 Neochori, West Mani
 Neromylos
 Nomitsis
 Oichalia
 Palaio Loutro
 Palaiokastro
 Paniperi
 Papaflessas
 Pappoulia
 Parapougki
 Pefko
 Pelekanada
 Perdikoneri
 Petalidi
 Petritsi
 Pidasos
 Pidima
 Pigadia
 Piges
 Pilalistra
 Piperitsa
 Platania
 Platanovrysi
 Plati
 Platsa
 Platy
 Poliani
 Polichni
 Polylofos
 Polythea
 Poulitsi
 Proastio
 Prodromos
 Prosilio
 Psari
 Pyla
 Pylos
 Pyrgos Kalamon
 Pyrgos Trifylias
 Raches
 Raptopoulo
 Revmatia
 Rigklia
 Rodia
 Romanos
 
 Sellas
 Siamo
 Sidirokastro
 Sitochori
 Skala
 Skliros
 Solaki
 Sotirianika
 Soulinari
 Sperchogeia
 Spilia
 Spitali
 Stamatino
 Stasimo
 Stasio
 Stavropigi
 Stenyklaros
 Sterna
 Stoupa
 Strefi
 Syrrizo
 Thalames
 Thouria
 Trachila
 Trikorfo
 Triodos
 Tripyla
 Tseria
 Tsoukalaiika
 Valta
 Valyra
 Vanada
 Vasiliko
 Velanidia
 Velika
 Verga
 Vlachopoulo
 Vlasis
 Vounaria
 Voutaina
 Vromovrisi
 Vryses
 Yameia
 Zermpisia
 Zevgolateio

By municipality

See also
List of towns and villages in Greece

 
Messenia